Chimps Inc. is a nonprofit, 501(c)(3) animal sanctuary located at P-B Ranch near Bend, Oregon, United States.

Chimps Inc. is a private sanctuary. Its purpose is to provide a safe haven for chimpanzees and allow them to live in dignity in as close to wild conditions as they can handle after being raised by humans and then "retired".

History

Chimps Inc. was founded in 1995 by Lesley Day to house chimpanzees from the private or entertainment sectors in need of a new home. Although the sanctuary is primarily dedicated to furthering chimpanzee conservation, it also houses wild cats.

In 2007, Chimps Inc. was involved in a legal dispute over custody of two chimpanzees, Emma and Jackson, sparking debate on whether or not non-human primates have rights. In 2008, Chimps Inc. was the beneficiary of the silent art auction that was a part of the 2008 Monkey Day celebration. As of 2010, the sanctuary was home to seven chimpanzees and one Canadian lynx.

In 2012, an intern was severely hurt by a chimp, but could not sue Chimps Inc. because of a waiver she had signed with the organization. The waiver also mentioned that only the managers of the ranch were allowed to call 911 for emergencies to avoid "any unnecessary scrutiny over safety concerns". In 2017, after a chimpanzee accidentally escaped from its enclosure, an investigation was led by the Oregon Occupational Safety and Health Division. Many employees' testimonies underlined the management's lack of concern for safety. 30 incidents happened in the ranch since its opening in 1995. Even its founder, Lesley Day, has lost a finger to a chimp. During the summer of 2018, some employees of the organizations were laid off. In February 2019, following a feud with the landlords of the ranch, Chimps Inc. announced it was moving the chimps to the behavioral research laboratory Ape Cognition and Conservation Initiative in Des Moines, Iowa.

Description 

Chimps Inc. is located in a 5-acre ranch near Bend, Oregon with a view of the Cascades.

Enid Chimp, who lives in Eastbourne, England, donates 10% of her weekly state pension to Chimps Inc. She also sells portrait paintings of Malcolm Zip by Barbara Haddock on Depop, with all the proceeds going to Chimps Inc.

Chimps Inc. offers both a volunteer program and internships. The volunteer program is for adults (18 years and older) who can dedicate at least four hours each week to helping at the sanctuary. The internship program is designed for people who are working towards careers in animal care, conservation, education, or advocacy.

Jane Goodall is on the advisory board.

The main fundraiser for the sanctuary is "the Civil War game", held in November at the P-B Ranch. For this event, supporters can become a sponsors, donate items for the silent auction, purchase TV advertisements that will replace the national ads on the ranch TVs, or just purchase tickets.

References

External links

Primate sanctuaries
Animal charities based in the United States
Animal welfare organizations based in the United States
Charities based in Oregon
Bend, Oregon
Environmental organizations based in Oregon
Environmental organizations established in 1995
1995 establishments in Oregon